The Nora Eccles Harrison Museum of Art (NEHMA) is an accredited academic art museum focused on modern and contemporary art at Utah State University in Logan, Utah. NEHMA was founded in 1982 with the ceramic collection of philanthropist and namesake Nora Eccles Harrison. The museum has since expanded to include over 5,500 objects focused on modernist and contemporary works created in the western region of the United States. The core of the collection explores certain key art historical movements including Beat, Los Angeles Post-Surrealism, Santa Fe Transcendentalism, and Bay Area Abstract Expressionism. The museum also collects and exhibits contemporary works that function as glimpses of the thriving art scenes found in many cities in the Western United States.  Additionally, the museum serves as the recipient of the Vogel Collection for the state of Utah.

History 
Nora Eccles Harrison and her second husband, Richard Harrison, founded the museum with a gift to build a museum building and more than four hundred ceramic objects. The building was designed by architect Edward Larrabee Barnes and opened in 1982.  In the fall of 2013 the courtyard outside the museum's entrance began renovations. NEHMA's collection continues to grow with ceramics in the vessel tradition, as well as works on paper, painting, sculpture and multimedia works, enabled largely through the support of the Marie Eccles Caine Foundation, Kathryn Caine Wanlass Foundation, Fredrick Quinney Lawson Foundation and the Lawson Foundation. 
In 2008 the Nora Eccles Harrison Museum of Art was selected to receive a gift from New York art collectors Herbert and Dorothy Vogel. These 50 works of art were part of a national gifts program entitled "The Dorothy and Herbert Vogel  Collection: Fifty Works for Fifty States.” This program has distributed 2,500 works of art from the Vogel's personal collection of over 4,000 pieces of modern and contemporary art, with 50 works going to one selected art institution in each of the 50 states.

The museum is accredited through the American Alliance of Museums (AAM) and is also a certified Utah museum through the Utah Division of Arts & Museums. Throughout its history, NEHMA has been dedicated to collecting, preserving, and exhibiting modern and contemporary visual art.  As an academic art museum and as part of the Caine College of the Arts at Utah State University, educational programs for both the students and general public remain central.

Past exhibits 
The Nora Eccles Harrison Museum of Art rotates exhibits regularly. Some past examples of exhibits since 2007 include:
ideas: an exhibition (January 22 – May 4, 2013) This exhibit was the result of student research, collaboration, and discovery in an experimental art history course on Conceptual Art.  It included artwork by a variety of conceptual artists creating art as a primary outlet for their ideas.
Fragments of Terror: Drawings by Jim Starrett (January 16, 2012 – June 11, 2012) With 27 paintings and drawings on display, this exhibition shows how Starrett's works, "...vibrate with such cool passion, such fiery ice, that they seem at once both hard products of a systematic rationality, of an almost mechanical design, and works of extraordinary emotional resonance." – Patrick E. White.
Bang! Thwack! Plop! Comics: an Influence on Contemporary Art (June 14, 2011 – July 28, 2012) This exhibition explored the intersection of comics and art with specific attention to themes and stylistic forms that have crossed over from the genre of comics into the world of visual art.
EcoVisionaries: Designs for Living on Earth (August 31, 2010 – May 9, 2011) This exhibition included socially engaged artists (the Harrisons and Ant Farm) who seek out and propose radical concepts using unusual materials to create innovation to reduce the impact of humans and/or preserve natural environments. 
USES OF THE REAL: Originality, Conditional Objects, Action/Documentation, and Contemplation (January 2008 -April 2011) USU museum staff and guest curators selected works from the museum's permanent collection that provoke the question "What makes it art?"
Sight & Sound: A Visual Metaphor (September 2005 – July 2008) The exhibit consisted of selected paintings and sculptures from the museum's permanent collection to provide a glimpse into simultaneous revolutions in art and music in the 20th century. Viewers experienced art with the added enhancement of music to deepen understanding.
Abstracting the Land: Southwest Transcendentalism (November 2007 – May 3, 2008) This exhibition of artwork from the permanent collection focused on painters working in 1930s  New Mexico known as the Transcendental Painting Group. The group established themselves as artists who strove to define their art beyond the traditions of landscape, still life, and figurative imagery.

References

External links
NEHMA Official Website

Art museums and galleries in Utah
University museums in Utah
Utah State University
Buildings and structures in Logan, Utah
Museums in Cache County, Utah
Museums of American art
American West museums
Art museums established in 1982
1982 establishments in Utah
Edward Larrabee Barnes buildings